Southend is the main settlement at the southern end of the Kintyre peninsula in Argyll and Bute, Scotland. The civil parish of Southend comprises the village and the surrounding land, used mainly for farming and forestry. The population of the parish is 497.

History

The village is located beside Dunaverty Bay, which at one end has a rocky promontory called Dunaverty Rock, where Dunaverty Castle was located.  Historically the local inhabitants may be first mentioned by Ptolemy as the Epidii (horse people), whose main town may have been named later in the Ravenna Cosmography as Rauatonium.  During the early medieval period Dunaverty became the location where Saint Columba first set foot in Scotland. Above the cemetery at Keil are two carved human footprints (Petrosomatoglyphs) similar to that seen at Dunadd, now called Columba's Footprints. Here it is claimed Columba first preached on Scottish soil, after being banished from Ireland.

The Annals of Ulster report a siege in 712 by king Sealbach of Dalriada, confirming the importance of Dunaverty Rock as a fortified centre of power. Robert the Bruce sheltered at the castle, which changed hands many times in the later medieval period. During the Dunaverty Massacre of 1647 the Catholic MacDonalds were burned alive in their stronghold at Dunaverty Castle.

Modern Southend

John Campbell, 5th Duke of Argyll developed the village as "Newton Argyll" in the late 18th century.

Within Southend parish there are St Blaan's church, Southend primary school, a GP's surgery, Dunaverty Hall (the new village hall with a football pitch and children's swing park), Dunaverty Golf Club's well-maintained and affordable 18-hole links course, Machribeg caravan park and camp-site, the Argyll Arms Hotel, the listed Art Deco Keil Hotel, the historic ruin of Keil School, Keil caves, and the Muneroy shop and tea-room.  The main employment sources are farming, forestry and tourism-related business.

The big attraction for tourists is the Mull of Kintyre, a high dramatic headland that is the closest point on Britain to Ireland. The Mull affords tremendous views and sunsets to the west including Ireland, Rathlin and Islay, and looks like a small piece of the Highlands. The road down from the top to the west-facing lighthouse is closed to most vehicles, but is walkable for the fit and determined. Several aircraft have crashed on the Mull, and there is a memorial to those lost in a Chinook helicopter crash in 1994 close to the road down to the lighthouse.

The beaches along the south coast of Kintyre are sandy, offering good walks in their own right or as part of the Kintyre Way, and good light for artists and photographers. The beaches are named for the farms (some of which offer caravans) including Gartvaigh, Brunerican, Penyseorach, Kilmashenachan, Macharioch and Polliwilline. The Antrim coast is 12 miles away and visible in clear weather.  Sanda Island lies two miles south-east of Southend, and can be seen on wildlife boat trips from Campbeltown harbour in summer.

Notable residents
Angus MacVicar, author, whose works detail rural life and history in the village and surrounding area.

References

External links
 Southend village website

Villages in Kintyre
Civil parishes of Scotland